Margaret S. Creighton is an American historian, writer and professor emerita at Bates College in Maine.

She is the author of many articles, essays and several award-winning books including Rites and Passages: The Experience of American Whaling, 1830-1870 (1995), The Colors of Courage: Gettysburg's Forgotten History: Immigrants, Women, And African Americans in the Civil War's Defining Battle (2005), The Electrifying Fall of Rainbow City: Spectacle and Assassination at the 1901 World's Fair (2016), and with Lisa Norling edited the collection Iron Men, Wooden Women: Gender and Seafaring in the Atlantic World, 1700-1920 (1996).

Creighton has taught courses at Bates College on the American Civil War, women's and gender history, and historical methods. Additionally, she has taught a course on the cultural history of the Boston Red Sox.

See also
 List of Bates College people
 List of historians
 Battle of Gettysburg

References

External links and sources
 Faculty page

Bates College faculty
Living people
21st-century American historians
American political writers
Historians of the United States
Year of birth missing (living people)
American women historians
21st-century American women writers